Channel One was a short-lived British television channel owned and operated by Virgin Media Television and then Sky plc. The channel was launched on 1 October 2007 at 21:00 on Freeview, Virgin Media and Sky as Virgin1, replacing Ftn. The channel broadcast 24 hours on cable, satellite and Freeview; a one-hour time-shift, Channel One +1, broadcast on cable and satellite.

BSkyB acquired the channel on 4 June 2010 and rebranded it as Channel One. On 15 September 2010, BSkyB announced that it would close Channel One and sister channels Bravo and Bravo 2. Channel One's Freeview space on the multiplex was used to launch Challenge there. Channel One closed on 1 February 2011 at 06:00 UTC, one month after Bravo and Bravo 2 closed. On the same day, it was replaced by Challenge on Freeview and Sky Atlantic on Sky.

History
It was announced in the summer of 2007 that Virgin Media Television was to launch the new channel. The network had previously expressed their interest in running a general entertainment channel to coincide with the relaunch on NTL: Telewest to Virgin Media. At first, the company stated that all of their other channels including Ftn, would still run as normal, but because of Ftn having a key Freeview primetime slot, this was later changed.

The channel was launched as Virgin1 at 21:00 on 1 October 2007 on all platforms (Freeview, Virgin Media and Sky) replacing former Virgin Media Television channel Ftn. Some media sources have claimed that it was intended to be in direct competition with British Sky Broadcasting's flagship channel, Sky1, which in August 2010 had a 0.8% share of the market compared with Virgin1's 0.7%.

On 20 February 2008, the channel moved from FTN's old slots on channels 153 and 154 on Sky and took over Bravo's slots on channels 
121 and 122, which were placed higher up on the EPG. The next day, the channel went on to achieve its highest ratings thus far, with the season premiere of Terminator: The Sarah Connor Chronicles which secured a 4.2% share of multi channel viewers.

On 27 April 2009, it was announced that Virgin1 (on Freeview) would move from multiplex D to multiplex A, allowing the channel to broadcast 24 hours a day. It's vacated slot was used to launch a time-shifted version of the channel which broadcast from 18:00 to 06:00. In Wales, it was only available from 09:00 to 19:00, with the +1 service only available from 19:00.

On 14 May 2009, Virgin Media Television announced plans to revamp the channel. On 9 June 2009, it underwent a rebranding with new idents, break bumpers and onscreen identity. As part of the rebrand a mascot called Red was introduced, a puppet character from the creator of the ITV Digital Monkey.

On 20 October 2009, the channel reduced its hours on Freeview to 09:00 – 03:00, allowing Tease Me TV to launch. The revocation of TMTV's licence in November 2010 freed up the bandwidth it used from Channel One, but it was left vacant until the closure of the channel.

From 30 October 2009, the channel briefly aired TNA iMPACT! at 21:00 (which was also shown on sister channel Bravo at the time). This was the first time wrestling has been aired on free television in the UK since 2001.

On 1 June 2010, the time-shifted version of the channel ceased broadcasting on Freeview channel 35, allowing Yesterday to extend its broadcast hours. The time-shifted service continued to operate on satellite and cable platforms, between 04:00 and 01:00 daily (the live Challenge Jackpot simulcast on Virgin1 between 00:00 and 03:00 was not time-shifted).

On 4 June 2010, British Sky Broadcasting and Virgin Media announced that they had reached an agreement for the acquisition by Sky of Virgin Media Television. Virgin1 was also a part of the deal, but was rebranded as Channel One on 3 September 2010, as the Virgin name wasn't licensed to Sky.

Timeshift channel
A 1-hour timeshift channel called Channel One +1 launched in September 2010.

Closure
On 15 September 2010, BSkyB announced that it would close Channel One and its sister channels Bravo and Bravo 2. Sky, having carried out a review of the VMTV channels, found that Channel One was too similar to Sky3, with which it sat alongside as a free to air channel on Freeview. Challenge would replace Channel One's former Freeview slot in turn, receiving a large boost in its programming budget. At 06:00 on 1 February 2011, Channel One ceased broadcasting on all platforms. The last programme was an episode of Star Trek: Enterprise. Since its closure, many programmes, including sci-fi and drama programming, were incorporated into Sky's free-to-air channel, Pick, whilst premium programming was moved to Sky's pay TV channels.

Most watched broadcasts
The following is a list of the ten most watched shows on Channel One, based on Live +7 data supplied by BARB up to 18 October 2010.

Programming

The schedule for Channel One consisted of a mixture of American and British comedy, drama and factual programming, both acquired and commissioned. The channel was pitched between male-targeted channel Bravo and female-targeted channel Living. In addition to exclusive content, Channel One also showed some content from Living, Bravo and Challenge.

Former logos

References

Living TV Group channels
Television channels in the United Kingdom
Television channels and stations established in 2007
Television channels and stations disestablished in 2011
Defunct television channels in the United Kingdom
Television channel articles with incorrect naming style